Newsagency may refer to:
News agency, an organization of journalists established to supply news reports to organizations in the news trade
Newsagent's shop, or Newsagency in Australian English